Mahabhoi Sasana Tank is situated on the right bank of the stream Gangua. It is mentioned as a tank in the forgotten monuments of Bhubaneswar, Odisha, India. But now it has no existence because of private construction over the tank. Only the old laterite pavements are visible below the structures.

References 

 http://www.ignca.gov.in/asi_reports/orkhurda113.pdf
 Book: Lesser Known Monuments of Bhubaneswar by Dr. Sadasiba Pradhan

Water supply and sanitation in India
Buildings and structures in Bhubaneswar
Geography of Bhubaneswar